is a publishing company headquartered in Misaki-cho, Chiyoda, Tokyo. It is a subsidiary of GAIA Holdings Corporation.

, the company has published children’s books and sold reference works. The name is an acronym for "Home Library Production". The company had 28 billion yen in turnover in 1975 and 20 billion yen in turnover in 1977.

References

External links

 Holp Shuppan 
 Holp Shuppan at Twitter 

Book publishing companies in Tokyo